Human-powered transport is the transport of person(s) and/or goods using human muscle power. Unlike animal-powered transport, human-powered transport has existed since time immemorial in the form of walking, running and swimming. Modern technology has allowed machines to enhance human-power.

Although motorization has increased speed and load capacity, many forms of human-powered transport remain popular for reasons of cost, convenience, leisure, physical exercise, and environmentalism. Human-powered transport is sometimes the only type available, especially in underdeveloped or inaccessible regions.

Modes

Non-vehicular

Crawling (human)
Walking (233 watts at 3 mph)
 Walking bus
Running (1,150 watts at 10 mph)
Sprinting (1,690 watts at 15 mph)
Swimming
Climbing and mountaineering
Ice skating, roller skating, and inline skating
Cross-country skiing

Human-powered vehicles (HPVs)

Land vehicles

Skateboards have the advantage of being so small and light that users can easily carry them when not skating.

The most efficient human-powered land vehicle is the bicycle. Compared to the much more common upright bicycle, the  recumbent bicycle may be faster on level ground or down hills due to better aerodynamics while having similar power transfer efficiency.

Velomobiles are increasingly popular in colder and/or wetter countries due to the protection they offer against the environment. Cargo bikes are used to transport cargo. Cycle rickshaws can be used as taxicabs.

Dutch cyclist Fred Rompelberg set a  speed record at the Bonneville Salt Flats in Utah on October 3, 1995 while cycling in the wake of a motor dragster pace-car. The wake of the pace-car reduced the aerodynamic drag against which Rompelberg pedalled to almost zero.

Greg Kolodziejzyk set two world records recognized by both the International Human Powered Vehicle Association and Guinness (TM) World Records on July 17, 2006 on a race track in Eureka, California. The first record is for the most distance traveled in 24 hours by human power , and the second for the world's fastest  time trial (23 hours, 2 minutes).
Both records were broken on August 6, 2010 by Christian von Ascheberg who drove  in 19 hours, 27 minutes and managed to go  in 24 hours with his Milan SL Velomobile.

 
It is held every year on the last weekend in May.

The Shweeb system is a proposed transit network using recumbent bicycle technology to power pods suspended from monorails.  A test built in Rotorua, New Zealand is open to the public as a leisure attraction.  In September 2010 the system was chosen to receive funding from Google as part of project 10100.  There are no active proposals for its implementation.

Aircraft

Fixed wing

The Pedaliante flew short distances fully under human power in 1936, but the distances were not significant enough to win the prize of the Italian competition for which it was built. The flights were deemed to be a result of the pilot's significant strength and endurance, and not attainable by a typical human. With the catapult launch, the plane successfully traveled the  distance outlined by the competition, but was declined the prize due to the takeoff method.

The first officially authenticated regularly feasible take-off and landing of a human-powered aircraft (one capable of powered takeoffs, unlike a glider) was made on 9 November 1961 by Derek Piggott in Southampton University's Man Powered Aircraft (SUMPAC).

Perhaps the best-known human-powered plane is the Gossamer Albatross, which flew across the English Channel in 1979.

Helicopters
 
The first officially observed human-powered helicopter to have left the ground was the Da Vinci III in 1989. It was designed and built by students at Cal Poly San Luis Obispo in California, USA. The second was the Yuri I in 1994, designed and built by students at Nihon University in Japan. On 13 June 2013, the AeroVelo Atlas was the first to complete a flight that lasted 64 seconds and reached an altitude of 3.3 meters, thus winning the Sikorsky Prize.

Airships and balloons
French inventors have built man-powered airships and balloons. Solar balloons and solar airships are new types of balloons and airships. Because lift is supplied through buoyancy, human power can be devoted to thrust.

Watercraft

Human-powered watercraft include prehistoric, historic and well-known traditional and sporting craft such as canoes, rowing boats and galleys. The term human-powered boat is often used for more modern craft using propellers and water wheels for propulsion. These can be more efficient than paddles or oars and especially allow the use of the leg muscles which are generally stronger than arm muscles, even for non-athletes. Competitive rowing boats use sliding seats to engage the legs for propulsion with an oar for this reason, but require considerable skill to use efficiently. In addition, there is little skill required for forward propulsion while looking forwards and craft such as pedalos are popular at resorts.

Hydrofoils
Hydrofoils have less water resistance at the highest speeds attainable by humans and are thus usually faster than displacement boats on short courses. The world speed record on water was set 27 October 1991 by MIT professor Mark Drela who pedalled a human-powered hydrofoil, "Decavitator", to 18.5 knots (21.3 mph)(9.53 meters/second) over a 100-meter course in Boston, Massachusetts, US.

Submarines
In 1989, the first human-powered International Submarine Race (ISR) was held in Florida with 17 craft. Since then nine more races have been held. The races themselves have been moved from the waters of Florida to the  David Taylor Model Basin at the Carderock Division of the Naval Surface Warfare Center in Bethesda, Maryland, and are held biennially. At the 9th ISR in 2007 (in which 23 submarines participated) several new records were set: A single-person craft, Omer5 achieved a record speed of 8.035 knots breaking the Omer team's previous record of 7.19 knots set by Omer 4 in 2004. Also Omer 6 snatched up a record for non-propeller driven craft with a speed of 4.642 knots.

See also

 Active mobility
 Adirondack guideboat
 Animal locomotion
 Bicycle and human powered vehicle museums, list of
 Carfree city
 Carrying on the head
 Erden Eruç
 Energy efficiency in transportation
 Jason Lewis
 Rowing
 Utility cycling

References

External links
 Human Powered Vehicle Records
 Human Powered Vehicle Challenge - American Society Of Mechanical Engineers

Air
 Human Powered Aircraft Group - Virginia Tech
 Human Powered Helicopters - History, technology, people
 Human powered blimp

Land
 Rose-Hulman Institute of Technology Human Powered Vehicle Team  - Videos, photos, links, and other information about human powered land vehicles

Water
 Human Powered Boats - Events, photos, links
 Human Powered Hydrofoils  from 1953 to 2005
 Decavitator Human-Powered Hydrofoil - videos, documentation
 Human Powered Submarine of Virginia Tech